The Sound in Your Mind is the 19th studio album by country musician Willie Nelson. This was his second album for Columbia Records.

Track listing
All songs written by Willie Nelson, except where noted.

Side one
"That Lucky Old Sun (Just Rolls Around Heaven All Day)" (Haven Gillespie, Beasley Smith) - 2:20
"If You've Got the Money (I've Got the Time)" (Lefty Frizzell, Jim Beck) - 2:05
"A Penny for Your Thoughts" (Jenny Lou Carson) - 3:22
"The Healing Hands of Time" - 3:58
"Thanks Again" - 2:14
"I'd Have to be Crazy" (Steven Fromholz) - 4:21

Side two
"Amazing Grace" (Traditional, arr. Nelson) - 5:41
"The Sound in Your Mind" - 3:27
"Medley" - 8:31
"Funny How Time Slips Away"
"Crazy"
"Night Life" (Paul Buskirk, Walt Breeland, Nelson)

Personnel
Willie Nelson - vocals, guitar, arrangements, production
Bobbie Nelson - piano
Paul English - drums
Rex Ludwick - drums
Jody Payne - guitar
Bee Spears - bass guitar
Mickey Raphael - harmonica
Steve Fromholz - harmony vocals on "I'd Have to Be Crazy"
Tom Morrell - pedal steel guitar on "That Lucky Old Sun"
Phil York - engineer

Charts

Weekly charts

Year-end charts

References

1976 albums
Willie Nelson albums
Columbia Records albums